Pointing dogs, sometimes called bird dogs, are a type of gundog typically used in finding game. Gundogs are traditionally divided into three classes: retrievers, flushing dogs, and pointing breeds. The name pointer comes from the dog's instinct to point, by stopping and aiming its muzzle towards game. This demonstrates to the hunter the location of their quarry and allows them to move into gun range. Pointers were selectively bred from dogs who had abundant pointing and backing instinct. They typically start to acquire their hunting instincts at about 2 months of age.

History

Pointing dogs may have descended from dogs from Spain, specifically of the Old Spanish Pointer (Furgus, 2002). Pointing dogs were originally used by hunters who netted the game. The dog would freeze or set (as in Setter) and allow the hunter to throw the net over the game before it flushed.  Flushing dogs, on the other hand, were often used by falconers to flush game for the raptors. Most continental European pointing breeds are classified as versatile gun dog breeds or sometimes HPR breeds (for hunt, point, and retrieve).  The distinction is made because versatile breeds were developed to find and point game as all pointing breeds, but were also bred to perform other hunting tasks as well. This distinction likely arose because while the British developed breeds which specialized in tasks such as pointing, flushing, and retrieving from land or water, in Continental Europe, the same dog was trained to be able to perform each of these tasks (albeit less effectively). The North American Versatile Hunting Dog Association defines versatility as "the dog that is bred and trained to dependably hunt and point game, to retrieve on both land and water, and to track wounded game on both land and water." As an example, German Shorthaired Pointers are often used to retrieve birds, i.e. duck hunting, whereas calling upon a Pointer to do the same would be less common. Unlike the pure pointing and setting breeds, many versatile dogs were bred for working in dense cover, and traditionally have docked tails.

The Westminster Kennel Club was organized in the early 1870s, and the club's early English import, "Sensation", is still used as the club logo.

Appearance
Pointing dogs come in all varieties of coats, from short-haired dogs, to wire-haired dogs, to silky-coated Setters. Most breeds tend to have some sort of spots on their body, whether the spots are small and round, or a large oval shape.

Breeds 

Pointers (and setters) include the following breeds:

 English Setter
 Gordon Setter
 Irish Red and White Setter
 Irish Setter
 Pointer

The following breeds are also considered versatile hunting dogs:

 Ariège Pointer
 Bracco Italiano
 Braque d'Auvergne
 Braque du Bourbonnais
 Braque Dupuy (extinct)
 Braque Français (two sizes: larger type Gascogne and Braque Français and smaller type Pyrénées)
 Braque Saint-Germain
 Brittany
 Burgos Pointer
 Český Fousek
 French Spaniel
 German Longhaired Pointer
 German Roughhaired Pointer
 German Shorthaired Pointer
 German Wirehaired Pointer
 Large Münsterländer
 Old Danish Pointer
 Pachón Navarro
 Perdigueiro Galego
 Portuguese Pointer
 Pudelpointer
 Slovak Rough-haired Pointer
 Small Münsterländer
 Spinone Italiano
 Vizsla
 Weimaraner
 Wirehaired Pointing Griffon
 Wirehaired Vizsla

See also
 Dogs portal
 List of dog breeds
Old Spanish Pointer, an extinct dog believed to be the first pointing breed

Citations

General bibliography 
 Fergus, Charles. Gun Dog Breeds: A Guide to Spaniels, Retrievers, and Pointing Dogs, The Lyons Press, 2002. .

 

Dog types
Hunting dogs